The RMS Duke of Rothesay was a steamer passenger ship operated by the London Midland and Scottish Railway from 1928 to 1956.

In service

Built at William Denny and Brothers, Dumbarton and completed in 1928, she was designed to operate as a passenger ferry on the Heysham to Belfast route.

Replacement

In 1956, along with her sister ships she was replaced by TSS Duke of Rothesay.

References

Passenger ships of the United Kingdom
Ferries of the United Kingdom
1928 ships
Ferries of Wales
Ships of British Rail
Ships of the London, Midland and Scottish Railway
Ships built on the River Clyde
Maritime incidents in 1929